Darbidan may refer to:
 Darbidan, Anbarabad
 Darbidan, Maskun, Jiroft County
 Darbidan, Rezvan, Jiroft County